Royasc is a dialect bridging the gap between the Ligurian language and the Occitan language. It is spoken in Italy and France.

Area of use

The Royasc dialect is spoken in the Upper Roya valley, at the boundary of France and Italy.
In France, it is spoken in the communes of Breil-sur-Roya, La Brigue, Fontan, Saorge, Tende (Alpes Maritimes).
In Italy, it is spoken in the province of Imperia, Liguria - communes of Olivetta San Michele and Triora (only in the villages of Realdo and Verdeggia) and in the province of Cuneo, Piedmont - communes of Briga Alta and the village of Viozene in the commune of Ormea.

The dialect of La Brigue, Briga Alta, Realdo, Viozene, and Verdeggia is also named Brigasc.

History and position
Royasc is the mountainous adaptation of the western Ligurian dialect. It received influence from the Occitan language as the Upper Roya valley was partly ruled by the County of Nice.

Its structure is Ligurian, but its position is discussed: some include it in the Ventimiglia dialect (intemelian) but others consider it a member of a very distinct group of Alpine Ligurian dialects, along with Pignasc and Triorasc.

Italian Royasc-speaking communes put themselves under the State Law for the protection of minorities, using the Occitan name to do so.

See also

Royasc
Intemelio
Ligurian language

References

External links
 Presentation of Olivetta San Michele in Italian and Brigasc (called Occitan on that site)
 Presentation of Triora in Italian and Brigasc (called Occitan on that site)
 A Vaštéra magazine website

Languages of France
Ligurian language (Romance)